Hatchet Cove is a settlement located southeast of Clarenville. The Way Office was established in 1888 and Elial Robbins was the first Waymaster. It had a population of 67 in 1956.

See also
 List of communities in Newfoundland and Labrador

Populated coastal places in Canada
Populated places in Newfoundland and Labrador